Bruce Connole (born November 6, 1958) is an American singer, songwriter, and guitarist.  He was the lead singer for the Jetzons and several other bands based in the Southwest United States.

Biography 
Bruce Connole was born in Chicago, Illinois, and moved to Arizona when he was only 3 years old, and lived there for most of his life. As a young teen, he ran away from home many times, which made it difficult to complete high school. During his sophomore year he dropped out of East High School in Phoenix.

The Beatles were one of the reasons why he started practicing guitar at the age of 10.

Connole spent much of his adult music career fluctuating between times of sobriety and times of depression and drug abuse. When he was clean, he formed bands and wrote music, but when he relapsed, the bands and their momentum would typically fall apart. Of his heroin addiction, Connole commented, "Instead of having a lot of little problems, you have one big one. But it was always a handicap. It never made me play or write any better." In 1990 he hit an especially low point where he contemplated suicide, but fear of the unknown kept him from taking action.

Connole is a prolific songwriter, and considered one of Phoenix's best rock'n'pop songwriters. He writes in a variety of styles, including punk, pop, alternative, rock, and bluegrass. Connole has been a singer, guitarist, and/or songwriter for many bands, including the Jetzons, Billy Clone and the Same, the Strand,  Cryptics, the Pearl Chuckers, Busted Hearts, the Revenants, and Suicide Kings.  He has also recorded two solo albums with independent record label, Fervor Records.

After decades of cyclical drug use, Connole eventually reached a point of steady sobriety on his birthday of 1990 (November 6). He said quitting dope "was about as courageous as running out of a burning house. I just got to the point where I was really desperate and I wasn't dead.'"

Connole is also a computer programmer. He got his start in the field by creating the website for his band, the Revenants and using home-computer recording to demo his new material. Later he worked for sonicbox.com, a company in Silicon Valley which developed a technology that allowed listeners to access high quality internet audio. His computer job allowed him to perform and write music when he wanted to, and not because he had to pay his bills.

Bands

Billy Clone and The Same 
In 1978, Bruce Connole and Mike Corte, both were old highschool friends, started playing together in a garage at first, and at some point the band "Billy Clone and The Same" formed. Billy Clone and the Same was a punk rock band based in Phoenix, Arizona. The band consisted of Mike Corte (vocals), Bruce Connole (guitar), Damon Doiron (bass), and Darrell Gleason (drums). Mike played the Gibson Flying V guitar, Damon played the Fender Precision Bass, and Bruce played the Fender Stratocaster. In 1980, the band released an EP called X&Y with Moon Dog Records. Later the same year, the band broke up when lead singer, Mike Corte, died of a heroin overdose. In 2000, The Arizona Republic listed Billy Clone and The Same as No. 38 in their list of The Top 100 Best Valley Rock Bands.

The Jetzons 
Probably the most famous of Connole's bands is the Jetzons. The Jetzons was a new wave band out of Phoenix, Arizona whose original members included Damon Doiron (bass), Bruce Connole (guitar and vocals), Brad Buxer (keyboard), and Steve Golladay (drums). They played their first gig on December 31, 1980 and their last in July 1983. Connole was the main songwriter for the Jetzons, and also played a Fender Stratocaster guitar for the band, while Damon played a white Fender Precision Bass. While the Jetzons never gained much national notoriety, according to the Phoenix New Times, the Jetzons were at one point the "biggest band" in Phoenix, Arizona. In 1982, they hit their peak and were filling venues all over Arizona and California. The band struggled to gain national attention, in large part because Connole's addictions prevented the band from performing and recording, In 1982, the Jetzons released the EP Made in America, produced by Mike Condello and recorded at Cherokee Studios in Los Angeles and Warner Bros. Studios in Burbank, CA as well as Pantheon Studios in Scottsdale, AZ. The record was released on Pan American Records.

In the 1980s the city of Tempe, Arizona's musicscene was seeing a surge of many bands who were influenced by Connole, eventually coming into international prominence with the signing of many local bands to major record labels, including multi-platinum recording artist the Gin Blossoms in the early 1990s, fronted by guitarist Doug Hopkins, formerly of the Moral Majority, 1981 and later the Psalms during the early 1980s, before establishing the Gin Blossoms. The Jetzons are considered to have helped establish this music scene and The Gin Blossoms acknowledge the Jetzons as a direct influence.

Though the Jetzons was his most successful act, Connole has expressed negative feelings about the group. He is not a fan of the band's most popular track "You" which he wrote along with keyboardist Brad Buxer. Connole commented in an interview with the Phoenix New Times, "'You' is so cute and so happy. It's one of those songs that you wish you'd never written." He has also called the Jetzons an "overrated New Wave cover band," further suggesting that the music did not reflect his actual sensibilities, instead being mostly a preoccupation with what was trendy during this era. However, he has also insisted that the Jetzons and his other musical projects were sincere artistic efforts which reflected his tastes at the specific times they were made.

When the Phoenix version of the Jetzons broke up, Bruce Connole and Brad Buxer moved to Los Angeles, where they re-formed the band and added musicians, Lloyd Moffitt (bass) and Craig Romero (drums). They regained their momentum and had no problem finding an audience for their music. The Los Angeles version of the Jetzons broke up in 1986.

In 2000, the Jetzons were listed as No. 16 on the Arizona Republic's list of The 100 Best Valley Rock Bands.

In 2009, Fervor Records posted a few of the Jetzons' previously unreleased songs from the album The Complete Jetzons on YouTube. One of the songs posted, "Hard Times," was recognized by video game fans as sounding very similar to music from the " Ice Cap Zone" theme from the video game, Sonic the Hedgehog 3. This unintentionally sparked renewed interest in the controversy which claimed that Michael Jackson contributed music to the game without receiving credit. (After leaving the Jetzons, keyboardist Brad Buxer became the musical director for Michael Jackson.) Sega and Jackson denied Jackson's involvement. However, recent interviews with former Sega composers and executives suggest that fans were likely correct and Michael Jackson was involved in composing music for Sonic 3. However, in regards to the "Ice Cap Zone theme," and its similarity with the song "Hard Times," current available public records from the US Performance Rights Societies ASCAP and BMI show Buxer is listed as an ASCAP affiliated songwriter, and Connole as a BMI affiliated songwriter. ASCAP does not list Buxer as an author of the song "Hard Times." BMI lists Connole as the sole writer of "Hard Times."

The Strand 
The Strand was an alternative rock band named for the Roxy Music song, "Do The Strand." They made their debut in 1987 at The Mason Jar, a nightclub and music venue in Phoenix, Arizona.  The Strand was a trio which included Connole (guitar and vocals), Damon Doiron (bass) and Alan Ross Willey (drums). Connole had been struggling with heroin addiction and had moved to California when Doiron called to ask him to return to Arizona to form a new band. Buxer almost joined The Strand, but decided to remain in Los Angeles as a session musician. The Strand marketed their first cassette by making it available in limited supply to the first 250 people to buy tickets to one of their first shows. This idea was initiated by Johnny D, a disc jockey at KEYX in Phoenix. In 1986, they self-released the album, The Strand. Connole's addictive cycle eventually broke up the band.

Cryptics 
The Cryptics were a grunge band created in 1990 with Connole (guitar and vocals) Jason Huff (guitar), Mark Cady (bass), and Rick Trobman (drums). Connole commented that the music he wrote for the Cryptics came from reading Baudelaire's poetry, William Burrough's writing, the music of Ministry and Big Black, and the depths of his depression. In 1991, the Cryptics released their album Kill Me with Machine Publishing, and in 1992 they released Darker Side of You with Epiphany Records.

The Pearl Chuckers 
During 1999–2000, Connole put together and performed with The Pearl Chuckers, a bluegrass side project, which consisted of artists Connole (banjo and vocals), Richard Taylor (guitar and vocals) who was later replaced by Amos Cox; Bobby Domings (drums) who was later replaced by Joe Jacques; and Ruth Wilson (bass), who was later replaced by Paul Schneider (bass).

Suicide Kings/The Revenants 
The Suicide Kings are a 50s and 60s-style honky tonk/alternative-country band which has been composed of different band members over the years: Bruce Connole (lead vocals and guitar), Richard Taylor (guitar and lap steel guitar), Mike Wolfe (guitar) John Rauhouse (steel guitar), Bobby Domings (drums), Chris Olson (drums), Al Penzone (drums), Vince Ramirez (drums), Brad Buxer (keyboards), Paul Schneider (bass) and Scott Kalkbrenner (bass). The band was named for the gambler's term for the King of Hearts who holds a sword to his own head.

In the late 1990s, a punk rock'n'roll band from Los Angeles, California, also named the Suicide Kings, threatened to sue Connole's band for using their previously trademarked name. In response, Connole and his band changed their name to The Revenants. After performing for a while as The Revenants, they received a cease and desist letter from someone in Louisville who claimed he had already trademarked that name. When Connole checked both trademarks he discovered the other The Suicide Kings had let their trademark lapse. The Revenants reverted to being called The Suicide Kings, and this time applied for a trademark.

Connole stated that his decision to play Country music was a decision to follow his true instincts as a musician. Growing up in Arizona, Connole frequently heard Country music, but he took a personal interest when he was 17 and feeling sorry for himself in a drug treatment center. When he heard the music of Hank Williams, he was hooked. However, at that time in his life he found it difficult to admit to his peers that he enjoyed Country music. In the late 1980s, he taught himself to play the banjo and country guitar and wrote several songs which eventually became part of The Revenants first CD.

In 1997, the Suicide Kings released a self-titled debut CD by Rattle Records.

In 1998, The Revenants released their album, Artists and Whores, on Epiphany Records, which was produced by Clarke Rigsby. The same year, they released Jukebox Cantina Combo Platter with Hayden's Ferry Records.

In 2006, The Suicide Kings re-formed.

In 2007, The Suicide Kings released a self-titled album by John Prine's Nashville label, Oh Boy Records.

In 2010, The Revenants released the album Black Cadillacs with Fervor Records.

In 2017, the Suicide Kings recorded a self-titled 7" vinyl produced by John P. Dixon and released by Ramco Records.

Busted Hearts 
While The Revenants/Suicide Kings were on hiatus, Connole formed the bluegrass outfit, Busted Hearts. This band was made up of Connole (banjo, lead vocals), Keith Jackson (guitar, back-up vocals),  Paul Schneider(bass), Kevin Pate (upright bass) Jason Graham (drums), Kenny Love (drums) and Amos Cox (mandolin). In 2003, Bruce Connole (and Busted Hearts) won the award of "Best Stage Shoes" from the Phoenix New Times for his black and white wingtips. In 2003, Busted Hearts opened for Connole's favorite bluegrass musician, Ralph Stanley. In 2006, the band released the album Sin, Sorrow, and Salvation with Fundamental Records.

Solo work 
Connole has also produced solo albums. In 2010 Fervor Records released his album Hillbilly Heroin, and in 2014, they released his album, The Narrow Road.

Legacy 
Additionally, Connole and former Jetzons bandmate Brad Buxer performed with Stevie Wonder on The Woman in Red soundtrack from 1984.

Connole's catalog of songs and recordings from 1982 to 2018 are controlled by independent record label Fervor Records.

Discography

TV and film

References

Living people
American male singer-songwriters
Musicians from Phoenix, Arizona
American country singer-songwriters
American rock songwriters
1958 births
Country musicians from Arizona
Singer-songwriters from Arizona